"I'll Never Fall in Love Again" is a popular song by composer Burt Bacharach and lyricist Hal David that was written for the 1968 musical Promises, Promises. Several recordings of the song were released in 1969; the most popular versions were by Dionne Warwick (released December 1969), who took it to number 6 on Billboard magazine's Hot 100 and spent three weeks topping the magazine's list of the most popular Easy Listening songs, and Bobbie Gentry (released July 1969), who topped the UK chart with her recording and also peaked at number 1 in Australia and Ireland, number 3 in South Africa and number 5 in Norway.

Promises, Promises
In the fall of 1968, Bacharach and David were in Boston for previews of Promises, Promises, the new musical for which producer David Merrick had asked if they would write the score, and Merrick realized, "We're missing a song in the middle of the second act, and what we need is something the audience can whistle on their way out of the theater." But around this time, Bacharach was hospitalized with pneumonia and wasn't able to sit at a piano to write the music until after he was released. By that time "Hal had already come up with the lyrics to 'I'll Never Fall in Love Again,' and my hospital stay had inspired him to write, 'What do you get when you kiss a girl? / You get enough germs to catch  pneumonia / After you do, she'll never phone you.'" When he finally sat with the lyrics in front of him, he recalls, "I wrote the melody for 'I'll Never Fall in Love Again' faster than I had ever written any song in my life." The surge of creativity paid off. "We came in with the song the next morning, and it went into the show a couple of nights later. 'I'll Never Fall in Love Again' became the outstanding hit from the score and pretty much stopped the show every night." Promises, Promises had its Broadway premiere on December 1 of that year, and the song was originally performed as a duet between the characters played by Jill O'Hara and Jerry Orbach as they ruminate on the various troubles that falling in love brings. They recorded it for the original Broadway cast album.

Chart hits

The first recording of "I'll Never Fall in Love Again" to reach any of the charts in Billboard was by Johnny Mathis, whose cover debuted on the magazine's Easy Listening chart in the issue dated May 17, 1969, and reached number 35 over the course of three weeks there. Bacharach's own version, which was sung by a female chorus, overtook the Mathis release after a May 31 debut on that same chart and got as high as number 18 during its nine-week stay. It also peaked at number 93 on the Hot 100 during the two weeks it spent there in July. Bobbie Gentry entered the UK singles chart with the song the following month, on August 30, and enjoyed one of her 19 weeks there at number one. She also peaked at number one in Ireland, number three in South Africa, and number five in Norway.

The most successful version of the song to be released as a single in the US was by Bacharach-David protégée Dionne Warwick, whose recording made its first appearance on the Hot 100 in the issue dated December 27, 1969, to start an 11-week run that took it to number six. The January 3, 1970, issue marked its first of 11 weeks on the magazine's Easy Listening chart, where it enjoyed three weeks at number one, and a seven-week stay on their list of the 50 Best Selling Soul Singles in the US began in the next issue and included a peak position at number 17. Her version also spent four weeks at number one on the Canadian Adult Contemporary chart and reached number three on the Canadian pop chart. The Dionne Warwick version is noted for Burt Bacharach playing a counterpoint melody on the piano, which is heard at the fading Coda section of the song.

In 1972, the Liz Anderson recording of the song peaked at number 56 on Billboards Hot Country Singles chart. In 1990 the Scottish pop rock band Deacon Blue opted for a slower arrangement on the duet between their vocalists Ricky Ross and Lorraine McIntosh as part of the four-song EP Four Bacharach & David Songs. The song was the main radio choice for the EP, which reached number two in the UK and became Deacon Blue's biggest hit in the UK (the EP was listed as the single rather than the song on UK chart). The song also reached number two in Ireland, and number 72 in the Netherlands.

Grammy nomination (1970) and win (1971)

At the 12th Annual Grammy Awards on March 11, 1970, Bacharach and David were the songwriting nominees of "I'll Never Fall in Love Again" in the  Song of the Year category but lost to Joe South for "Games People Play". Because the eligibility period ended on November 1, 1969, however, Warwick was not nominated until the following year, when she won in the category of Best Contemporary Vocal Performance, Female.

Chart performance

Weekly chartsDionne WarwickYear-end chartsBobbie Gentry'

See also
List of number-one singles of 1969 (Ireland)
List of number-one singles from the 1960s (UK)
List of number-one adult contemporary singles of 1970 (U.S.)

References

Bibliography

 
 

1968 songs
1969 singles
1970 singles
Bobbie Gentry songs
Dionne Warwick songs
Irish Singles Chart number-one singles
UK Singles Chart number-one singles
Songs from musicals
Songs with lyrics by Hal David
Songs with music by Burt Bacharach
Scepter Records singles
Torch songs
Johnny Mathis songs